Alice Pickering (1860 – 18 February 1939; née Alice Mabel Simpson) was an English tennis player.

Pickering played at the Wimbledon Championships from 1895 to 1901. In 1896, she won the all-comers-competition at Wimbledon 1896, but lost the challenge round against Charlotte Cooper 2–6, 3–6. She again reached the all-comers final in the following year, but this time lost to Blanche Bingley.

In 1896, she won the doubles competition at the Irish Championships with Ruth Durlacher.

Grand Slam finals

Single (1 runner-up)

References

British female tennis players
1860 births
1939 deaths
Place of birth missing